Kamieniuki is a village in Belarus, in the Brest Region, in the Kamenec District, the administrative seat of the Kamienieki Rural Council. It is located in the Belovezhskaya Pushcha National Park which is the Belarusian part of  the Białowieża Forest, 21 km north of the Kamyenyets, 60 km from Brest, 47 km from the railway station Zhabinka, on the Leśna Prawa river.

History
In the years 1921–1939 it belonged to the Gmina Białowieża. According to the Polish census of 1921, 138 people lived in the village, all of them Orthodox. At the same time, 13 residents declared Polish nationality, 108 Belarusians and 17 other. There were 22 residential buildings in the village.

References

Villages in Belarus
Brestsky Uyezd
Polesie Voivodeship
Populated places in Brest Region
Brest Litovsk Voivodeship
Białowieża Forest
Kamenets District